The Prince of Tennis II, known in Japan as , is a Japanese manga series written and illustrated by Takeshi Konomi. It is a sequel to Konomi's manga series The Prince of Tennis. It has been serialized in Shueisha's shōnen manga magazine Jump Square since March 2009. A 13-episode anime television series adaptation was broadcast on TV Tokyo from January to March 2012. A new anime television series titled The Prince of Tennis II: U-17 World Cup aired from July to September 2022.

Plot

The New Prince of Tennis is set shortly after the end of the original manga. Ryoma Echizen returns to Japan after his trip to America as a candidate for the Japanese U-17 (under 17) High School Representatives Selection Camp, along with 50 other middle school tennis players.

Media

Manga

The New Prince of Tennis, written and illustrated by Takeshi Konomi, was announced by Shueisha's Jump Square on November 4, 2008. The series began serialization in the magazine on March 4, 2009. Shueisha has collected its chapters into individual tankōbon volumes. The first volume was released on August 4, 2009. As of February 3, 2023, thirty-eight volumes have been released.

Anime

A 13-episode anime television series adaptation by Production I.G and M.S.C ran from January 5 to March 29, 2012. The episodes were collected in seven DVDs, released from April 20, 2012, to April 24, 2013. Each DVD included a special original video animation (OVA) episode. Crunchyroll streamed the series.

A ten-episode OVA, titled The Prince of Tennis II OVA vs. Genius 10, was released on five DVDs from October 29, 2014, to June 26, 2015. The OVA has been streamed by Crunchyroll.

A two-part original net animation (ONA) by Studio Kai and M.S.C, titled The Prince of Tennis II: Hyotei vs. Rikkai Game of Future, was released on February 13 and April 17, 2021, respectively.

In April 2021, Funimation announced that they licensed the entire The Prince of Tennis anime franchise. and The Prince of Tennis II was added to their platform on August 17 of the same year.

During the 20th anniversary event of The Prince of Tennis on October 10, 2021, it was announced that a new anime television series titled The Prince of Tennis II: U-17 World Cup is being produced. The staff of the Hyotei vs. Rikkai Game of Future ONA series, as well as the main cast members, reprised their roles. It aired from July 7 to September 29, 2022, on TV Tokyo. The opening theme song is "I can fly" by Yoshiki Ezaki and Bleecker Chrome, while the ending theme song is "Dear Friends" by TeniPri Artistars. Crunchyroll has licensed the series and will be streaming it along with an English dub.

Notes

References

External links
  
  
 

2012 anime television series debuts
2022 anime television series debuts
The Prince of Tennis
Crunchyroll anime
Funimation
Production I.G
Sequel comics
Shōnen manga
Shueisha manga
Studio Kai
Tennis in anime and manga
TV Tokyo original programming